Bradstreet Observatory  is an astronomical observatory owned and operated by Eastern University.  Built in 1996, it is located in St. Davids,  Pennsylvania (USA). It is named after the current astronomy professor, David Bradstreet.

See also 
List of astronomical observatories

References

External links
 Bradstreet Observatory Clear Sky Clock Forecasts of observing conditions.

Astronomical observatories in Pennsylvania
Eastern University (United States)
1996 establishments in Pennsylvania